The Cad is a left tributary of the river Olt which flows through Romania. It flows into the Olt near Mădăraș.

References

Rivers of Romania
Rivers of Harghita County